First Lady of Namibia is the title of the wife of the president of Namibia. There have been three first ladies (and presidents) since Namibia's independence in 1990. Namibia's current first lady is Monica Geingos, who has held the office since 21 March 2015.

First ladies of Namibia

See also
List of presidents of Namibia

References

Politics of Namibia
Presidents of Namibia
Namibia
Lists of Namibian people
Namibia politics-related lists